Bachaura is a village in Pindra Tehsil of Varanasi district in the Indian state of Uttar Pradesh. The village falls under gram panchayat by the same name as the village. The village is about 34 kilometers North-West of Varanasi city, 273 kilometers South-East of state capital Lucknow and 794 kilometers South-East of the national capital Delhi.

Demography
Bachaura has a total population of 1,746 people amongst 284 families. Sex ratio of the village is 1,030 and child sex ratio is 846. Uttar Pradesh state average for both ratios is 912 and 902 respectively .

Transportation
Bachaura can be accessed by air (Lal Bahadur Shastri Airport), train (Babatpur railway station) and by road. Nearest operational airports are Varanasi airport (16 kilometers) and Allahabad Airports (134 kilometres West).

See also
Pindra Tehsil
Pindra (Assembly constituency)

Notes
  All demographic data is based on 2011 Census of India.

References 

Villages in Varanasi district